Sabroskya is a genus of small-headed flies in the family Acroceridae. It is known from South Africa and Malawi. It is named after the American entomologist Curtis Williams Sabrosky.

Species
Three species are included in the genus:
 Sabroskya ogcodoides Schlinger, 1960 – South Africa: Eastern Cape
 Sabroskya palpalis Barraclough, 1984 – South Africa: KwaZulu-Natal
 Sabroskya schlingeri Winterton & Gillung, 2012 – Malawi: Northern Region

References

Acroceridae
Nemestrinoidea genera
Diptera of Africa